The John and Maria Hein House is located in Neillsville, Wisconsin, USA.

History
The Heins were German immigrants who owned a stave and heading mill and a dry goods and grocery store. The house was added to the State and the National Register of Historic Places in 2006.

References

Houses on the National Register of Historic Places in Wisconsin
National Register of Historic Places in Clark County, Wisconsin
Houses in Clark County, Wisconsin
Queen Anne architecture in Wisconsin
Houses completed in 1892